Oberes Glantal ("upper valley of the Glan") is a Verbandsgemeinde ("collective municipality") in the district of Kusel, in Rhineland-Palatinate, Germany. The seat of the Verbandsgemeinde is in Schönenberg-Kübelberg. It was formed on 1 January 2017 by the merger of the former Verbandsgemeinden Glan-Münchweiler, Schönenberg-Kübelberg and Waldmohr.

The Verbandsgemeinde Oberes Glantal consists of the following Ortsgemeinden ("local municipalities"):

 Altenkirchen
 Börsborn
 Breitenbach
 Brücken
 Dittweiler
 Dunzweiler
 Frohnhofen
 Glan-Münchweiler
 Gries
 Henschtal
 Herschweiler-Pettersheim
 Hüffler
 Krottelbach
 Langenbach
 Matzenbach
 Nanzdietschweiler
 Ohmbach
 Quirnbach
 Rehweiler
 Schönenberg-Kübelberg
 Steinbach am Glan
 Wahnwegen
 Waldmohr

Verbandsgemeinde in Rhineland-Palatinate